The Final of the 2007 Super 14 season, a provincial rugby union competition in the Southern Hemisphere, took place on 19 May 2007 at ABSA Stadium in Durban, South Africa. The match was won by the Bulls 20 points to 19 over their hosts the Sharks. The match had four tries - two by each team, and the last of which was scored by Bulls' wing Bryan Habana in the 82nd minute to give his team the trophy. It was the first Super rugby final to be played in South Africa, as well as the first all-South African final, and the first final with a South African winner.

Road to the Final

The Sharks and Bulls finished the round-robin first and second on the Super 14 table respectively. The Crusaders lost to the Chiefs in their last round-robin match (ending a 26-game home winning streak), but managed to secure a bonus point, losing by seven points. The Blues then defeated the Force in Perth to qualify for the semi-finals. The Sharks then went to the top of the table after defeating the Stormers 36-10 in Cape Town. The Bulls then played the Reds in Pretoria, and would be able to finish in second place if they won by a margin of 72 or more. They ended up crushing the Reds by 92-3 — the largest winning margin in Super Rugby history.

The Sharks then hosted the Blues in Durban, and the Bulls hosted the Crusaders in Pretoria. This was the first time both semi-finals had been hosted in South Africa. The Sharks defeated the Blues 34-18 with three tries to two, and the Bulls defeated the Crusaders 27-12 in a try-less match.

Match

First half
Two minutes into the first half Bulls' wing Brian Habana tackled Sharks' fullback Percy Montgomery in the air as he fielded a bomb. Montgomery fell on his head and Habana was subsequently penalized by referee Steve Walsh - he was considered lucky not to be issued a yellow card for such a dangerous tackle. After eight minutes Sharks' scrum-half Ruan Pienaar tapped and ran from a penalty breaking the Bulls' line and ending up in the Bulls' 22. From the resulting play the Sharks were awarded penalty after JP Nel infringed at the tackle. The penalty was converted by Montgomery to put them 3-0 up.

When the Bulls were awarded a penalty 45 metres out they elected to kick for touch, and from the resulting lineout the Bulls won possession. After two phases Bulls captain Victor Matfield passed the ball to Pierre Spies who broke through the Sharks line to score a try under the post. The try was converted by Derick Hougaard to give the Bulls a 7-3 lead after 13 minutes. The Sharks responded five minutes later when a pass from Spies was intercepted by Sharks winger JP Pietersen who outran three Bulls defenders to score. Montgomery missed the conversion, and after 19 minutes the Sharks led 8-7.

The next score came after the Sharks counterattacked from their own 22 metre line before Butch James attempted a drop goal. He missed but referee Steve Walsh was playing advantage for accidental off-side, and Montgomery kicked the resulting penalty to give the Sharks an 11-7 lead after 29 minutes. Three minutes later Hougaard kicked a penalty for the Bulls to reduce the Sharks lead to 11-10.

Following a Butch James bomb, the Bulls were penalised for being off-side and Montgomery kicked the penalty to extend the Sharks' lead to 14-10. Prior to half time the Bulls were penalised for collapsing a Sharks' maul, but Montgomery missed the penalty attempt. The Sharks went into the second half leading 14-10.

Second half
Early in the second half Bulls flyhalf Hougaard attempted a drop goal but was unsuccessful. Then on 43 minutes he attempted a 53metre penalty but the attempt fell short. Soon after Bulls hooker Gary Botha broke through three Sharks defenders and fed the ball to Pedrie Wannenburg, but the Sharks cover defence prevented him scoring when Steyn forced him out at the corner. Sharks lock Albert van den Berg nearly scored in the 56th minute but was tackled out by Hougaard. Following sustained pressure from the Bulls with pick and goes, their centre Wynand Olivier was only prevented from scoring a try due to a James tackle. James was penalised however and Hougaard converted the penalty to narrow the Sharks lead to 14-13 in the 59th minute.

With four minutes remaining Sharks lock Johann Muller won a lineout 25 metres from the Bulls' line. The Sharks then mauled for before it maul collapsed three metres from the Bulls line. After four phases of driving play Van den Berg drove past Danie Rossouw and Derick Kuün to score a try for the Sharks. Steyn then missed the conversion; the Sharks now led 19-13. The Bulls then needed to score a converted try to win the match, and with only a few minutes remaining of regular time they started attacking expansively. In the 79th minute Gary Botha grubber kicked the ball from inside Bulls territory to within the Sharks 22-metre line. François Steyn collected the ball but did not kick out, and instead kicked down field where the ball was collected by Bulls' captain Victor Matfield. The Bulls spread the ball, and went through several phases until it reached winger Bryan Habana near the right touchline. Habana jinked back infield and ran through a gap in the Sharks' defence before scoring a try five metres to right of the goal-posts. The 83rd minute try was then converted by Hougaard to give the Bulls' a 20-19 victory.

Match details

See also
2007 Super 14 season
Rugby union in South Africa

Notes

References

Final
2007
2007 in South African rugby union
Sharks (rugby union) matches
Bulls (rugby union) matches